Filatov's disease may refer to:

 Dukes' disease
 Infectious mononucleosis